The Stearman LT-1 (Light Transport-1) was a late 1920s American biplane, carrying four passengers plus mail.

Design and development

It was an unequal span, single bay biplane, its lower span only 70% that of the upper and with only 40% of its area. The wings were built around twin spars so, because of the narrower chord of the lower wings, the leading members of the N-form interplane struts which joined the wing spars leaned forward. Both upper and lower wings were set with 2° of dihedral and both carried ailerons, which were externally interconnected. Navigation and landing lights, the latter in streamlined underwing housings, were standard.

The LT-1 was powered by a  Pratt & Whitney Hornet radial engine, nose-mounted with its nine cylinderheads exposed for cooling. Behind the engine there was a mail compartment and behind that a windowed cabin seated four passengers, provided with airspeed meter, altimeter and map box. Its pilot had an open cockpit with windscreen and streamlined headrest built into the rounded upper fuselage decking.

Its tail was conventional, with a tailplane mounted on top of the fuselage and a cropped triangular fin with a rather angular balanced rudder.

The undercarriage was also conventional, though with a tail wheel rather than a skid. Its mainwheels were on split axles and rearward drag struts, both mounted centrally on the fuselage underside, with  vertical shock-absorbing legs.

Operational history

The date of the LT-1's first flight is not known but it was certificated in 1929. The prototype was destroyed not long after its first flight by a wind storm. At least one was used by Interstate Airlines until 1934, after which it operated in China.

Specifications

See also

References

Sesquiplanes
Single-engined tractor aircraft
1920s United States civil utility aircraft
LT-1